St. Mark's School may refer to:

St. Mark's School, Bournemouth, a coeducational school in Dorset, England
St. Mark's School (Hong Kong), a coeducational school, grades F.1–F.6 (Equivalent of Grades 7–12), in the Eastern District of Hong Kong
St. Mark's School (Massachusetts), a coeducational, Episcopal, preparatory school in Southborough, Massachusetts
St Mark's School (Mbabane), a public coeducational school, grades 1–12 and A-Level (2 years), in Mbabane, Eswatini
St. Mark's School of Texas, a nonsectarian preparatory day school for boys in Dallas, Texas
St Mark's Catholic School, Hounslow, a secondary school in London, England
St Mark's Church School, the only independent Anglican co-educational school in Wellington, New Zealand, for children aged from two (Early Childhood) to Year 8
St. Mark's High School, a coeducational Roman Catholic high school in Wilmington, Delaware, United States
St. Mark's Senior Secondary Public School, a coeducational English medium institution in West Delhi, India

See also
St. Mark's (disambiguation)